Dinah May (9 September 1954), is an English former model, former Miss Great Britain, and former actress, latterly the personal assistant to film director Michael Winner.

Career
May was born in Irby, Cheshire, and trained as a hairdresser. However, she found that she earned more money as a part-time model, and so took that up full-time. In 1976 she won Miss Great Britain.

After this, she moved into television and acting, taking supporting parts in Blake's 7, Harry's Game and The Optimist before gaining the part of Samantha Partridge  in Brookside, in which on 17 July 1984 she appeared in the first "Brookside wedding".

Michael Winner
In 1982 she met British film director Michael Winner in a restaurant, and became his PA in 1990. She undertook the role for the next 22 years, accompanying him in both his personal life and on his various film sets.

Personal life
May was married, and has two adult sons, but divorced in 2009. She has an extensive collection of vintage and contemporary photographs including press photographs, still lifes, celebrity Polaroids, and nude studies.

Filmography
The Optimist (1983) - Lady racing driver
Death Wish 3 (1985) - Nurse #1
Claudia (1985) - Party Hostess
A Chorus of Disapproval (1989) - Girl at Work
Bullseye! (1990) - Girl in Bar (final film role)

References

External links
Personal website

1954 births
Living people
People from Heswall
British hairdressers
English female models
English television actresses
Secretaries
People educated at St Catherine's School, Twickenham